The Ottawa Valley Lightning are a junior C ice hockey team in the National Capital Junior Hockey League of Hockey Eastern Ontario. As of the 2018–19 season, the team is inactive.

History
The Maxville Mustangs were founded in 1998. In 2010, the Mustangs were sold to investors in Papineauville, Quebec, and became the Vikings. In 2016, the Vikings won their second consecutive NCJHL championship with a seventh game victory over the Embrun Panthers for the second consecutive year. After the 2016–17 season, the team announced that they were moving to St-André-Avellin, Quebec and play out of that local arena. As part of the relocation, the team also changed their name to Papineau Vikings. In 2018, the Vikings won their third championship in four years by defeating the North Dundas Rockets in seven games.

The franchise was sold in May 2018 and planned to relocated to Stittsville, Ontario, and rebranded as the Valley Golden Kings. However, they subsequently announced the team would be the Ottawa Valley Lightning and but did not name a home location. On 25 July 2018, the NCJHL announced the franchise would sit out the 2018–19 season entirely.

Season-by-season record
Note: GP = Games Played, W = Wins, L = Losses, T = Ties, OTL = Overtime Losses, GF = Goals for, GA = Goals against, Pts = Points

Individual player awards

Mustangs individual records

Regular season

Players
Most Goals - Game
5 - Steven Knapp (Feb 13/09 vs. East Ottawa Thunder)
Most Goals – Season
35 - Shane O'Brien(2006–2007)
Most Goals - Career
87 - Shawn Borris (2005–2009)
Most Assists - Game
8 - Shane O'Brien (Feb 6/06)
Most Assists - Season
51 - Shane O'Brien (2006–2007)
Most Assists - Career
129 - Shane O'Brien (2004–2007)
Most Games - Career
161 - Jonathan Bray (2001–2004)
Most Penalty Minutes – Season
229 - Ted Lachance( 2002–2003)
Most Penalty Minutes - Career
575 - Andrew Michaud (2004–2007)
Most Points – Season
86 - Shane O'Brien (2006–07)
Most Points - Career
199 - Shane O'Brien (2004–2007)

Goalies
Most Assists by a goalie - Season
2 - Dan Desnoyer (2002–2003)
Most Games played by a goalie - Season
32 - Joel Morrissey(2006–2007)
Most Games played by a goalie - Career
66 - Joel Morrissey (2005–2008)

Playoffs

Players
Most Goals - Career
11 - Shawn Borris (2005–2009)
Most Goals - Season
4 - Grant Mitchell (2008–2009)
4 - Richard Mulligan (2008–2009)
Most Assists - Career
10 - Adam Lariviere (2005–2009)
10 - Shane O'Brien (2004–2007)
Most Assists - Season
6 - Adam Lariviere (2008–2009)
6 - Ryan Brady-Gratton (2008–2009)
6 - Steven Knapp (2008–2009)
Most Career Games
21 - Jonathan Bray (2001–2004)
Most Career Points
17 - Shawn Borris (2005–2009)

Goalies
Most Career Games
12 - Dan Desnoyer

Leading scorer in a season by year
2008 - Shawn Borris(71)
2007 - Shawn Borris(40)
2006 - Shane O'Brien(86)
2005 - Shane O'Brien(50)
2004 - Jonathan Bray(30)
2003 - Jonathan Bray & Shane O'Brien(36)
2002 - Jonathan Bray(34)
2001 - Nick Adam(41)
2000 - Pat Berlinguette(28)
1999 - Brad McMillan(38)

References

External links
Valley Golden Knights website

Eastern Ontario Junior C Hockey League teams
Ice hockey clubs established in 1998